The Issoire Iris was a sailplane produced in France in the early 1980s. It was a conventional, single-seat mid-wing design of fibreglass construction intended to be easy to fly for the novice pilot. Originally designed with a T-tail, the Iris was produced with a conventional, low-set tailplane.

The prototype made its first public appearance at the 1977 Paris Air Show and completed flight testing with the CEV early the following year, with certification expected to follow shortly thereafter.

Specifications

References

 
 

1970s French sailplanes
T-tail aircraft
Aircraft first flown in 1977
Glider aircraft
Mid-wing aircraft